Dourges is a commune in the Pas-de-Calais department in the Hauts-de-France region of France.

Geography
The canalized river Deûle flows through the commune.

Population

Places of interest
 The church of St.Piat, dating from the twentieth century.
 Traces of an old castle and an ancient farm.
 The Commonwealth War Graves Commission cemetery.

See also
Communes of the Pas-de-Calais department

References

External links

 A regional website 
 The CWGC cemetery
 Dourges on the Quid website 

Communes of Pas-de-Calais
Artois